The Garachay is a river in Qabala raion of Azerbaijan. It flows through the western end of an ancient city of Qabala. In the suburbs of Qabala, it joins other small rivers Hamzali, Mirazabeyli and Gojalan. It flows into the Turyan near the village Savalan.

See also
Rivers and lakes in Azerbaijan
Nature of Azerbaijan

External links
Qabala Executive Power: Rivers section

Rivers of Azerbaijan
Qabala District